Richard Harvey (1890 – death unknown), nicknamed "Lefty", was an American Negro league pitcher between 1912 and 1921.

A native of Nashville, Tennessee, Harvey made his Negro leagues debut in 1912 with the Chicago Giants and St. Louis Giants. He went on to play for the Brooklyn Royal Giants, Lincoln Giants, and Lincoln Stars, and finished his career in 1921 with a brief stint with the Bacharach Giants.

References

External links
  and Seamheads

1890 births
Date of birth missing
Year of death missing
Place of death missing
Bacharach Giants players
Brooklyn Royal Giants players
Chicago Giants players
Lincoln Giants players
Lincoln Stars (baseball) players
St. Louis Giants players
Baseball pitchers